Dick Termes is an American artist who uses a  six-point perspective system that he devised to create unique paintings on large spheres called Termespheres.  He is the world's leading spherical artist. In 2014, Dick was inducted into the South Dakota Hall of Fame.  He currently lives and works in Spearfish, South Dakota.

Termespheres
Termespheres are paintings on spherical canvases that capture an entire environment (up, down, left, right, front and back).  Their style was inspired by Termes's desire to "paint the total picture."  Termespheres are typically hung by small chains and rotated with electric ceiling motors to reveal a complete, closed universe as the spheres slowly rotate.

One of his termespheres is most famously used on the cover of an edition of A Brief History of Time of the late physicist Stephen Hawking.

Workshops and lectures
Termes conducts lectures and workshops for schools, universities, and the general public, revealing the connections between art and math/science in his work.

Personal life and education

Dick Termes was born in California, where his father worked in a shipyard.

He received a B.S. with an art major from Black Hills State University in 1964, a master's degree in art in 1969 from the University of Wyoming (the time when the idea for the Termesphere was first developed) and Masters of Fine Arts at Otis Art Institute of Los Angeles County, 1971. He joined the South Dakota State Arts Council in 1972.

Awards
South Dakota Hall of Fame Induction, Chamberlain SD. 2014
Rushmore Honors Award, Rapid City SD. 2006
Breckenridge Festival of Film, Documentary TERMESPHERES: TOTAL WORLDS 2001
Governor's Award for Distinction in Creative Achievement 1999
S.D. Museum of Art- Artistic Achievement Citation, 1986
Four South Dakota Arts Council Fellowship Grants, 1976-80-84-94
Three Semesters paid by Otis Art Institute, Los Angeles Ca.1969–71 for MFA

References

External links
 http://www.termespheres.com This is the personal web site for Dick Termes.
 
 http://www.maa.org/mathland/mathtrek_12_20_04.html An installment of Ivars Peterson's MathTreck for the Mathematical Association of America that features Dick Termes’ spherical worlds.
 http://www.boingboing.net/2004/12/27/spherical-paintings.html A post on BoingBoing by David Pescovitz which describes Termespheres and provides a link to the Termespheres website.
 http://mathpaint.blogspot.com/2007/01/spherical-artworks-by-dick-termes.html Mathematical Paintings and Sculptures blog post on Dick Termes.
 http://arpam.free.fr/termes.html An article entitled "Getting Out of the Box and Into the Sphere" by Dick Termes which describes concepts and the geometry behind Termespheres.
 https://web.archive.org/web/20070813220434/http://www.mmi.unimaas.nl/people/Veltman/articles/perspectives/art35.htm A paper by Kim H. Veltman entitled "Perception, Perspective and Representation in North America" in which Dick Termes and his work is discussed.
 http://www.rudyrucker.com/blog/2008/06/26/dick-termes-paints-on-spheres/ Rudy's Blog has a wonderful explanation of Dick Termes Termespheres and shows the environment of the domes Termes works in.  This came from  a visit Rudy made to the Black Hills.
 https://web.archive.org/web/20100603085528/http://agsci.oregonstate.edu/orb/sites/default/files/TomorrowsTableReview.pdf This is a great article by SCIENCE on Termes’ work.
 https://web.archive.org/web/20091010031811/http://hopsd.org/exhibits/termespheres/ This shows a video of Termes"  HANDS ON PARTNERSHIP showing that is touring the state of South Dakota which shows the connection of math and art.
 http://www.bridgesmathart.org/art-exhibits/bridges2005/DickTermes.html This shows many spheres which tie to the Math/Art connection put together by a group called Bridges which meet in a different country every years.
 
 https://books.google.com/books?id=6c0qxylJdH8C&pg=RA1-PA279&lpg=RA1-PA279&dq=termesphere&source=bl&ots=1Z385aw1Vw&sig=EhrARW7GHMa2n_n0NVTInYddoS8&hl=en&ei=LX5FSs78DpSuNoTJtZ8B&sa=X&oi=book_result&ct=result&resnum=2 This is an article on Termespheres which gets into some wonderful details on Termes's work.
 

Living people
Artists from South Dakota
Black Hills State University alumni
University of Wyoming alumni
Otis College of Art and Design alumni
People from Spearfish, South Dakota
American male painters
20th-century American painters
21st-century American painters
Year of birth missing (living people)
20th-century American male artists